Lemass is a surname. Notable people with the surname include:

 Eileen Lemass (born 1932), Irish politician, wife of Noel
 Noel Lemass (1929–1976), Irish politician
 Seán Lemass (1899–1971), Irish head of government
 Lemass era, a period of economic change between 1959 and 1966